Lamar Jackson (27 April 1983– 3 June 2022), known by his stage name Hypo, was a British grime rapper, songwriter, producer whose songs include 'First Night',  ‘Run These Streets’, 'All Summer' and ‘Flex On My X’.

He had briefly dated British R&B singer Emeli Sande until 2017.  

He was murdered on 3 June 2022 after attending a Platinum Jubilee party in Woodford Green, London.

See also 
List of murdered hip hop musicians

References

External links 

 Clashmusic - UK Rap Legend Hypo Stabbed
 Annual return 13.10.2010 - Lamar Jackson's

1983 births
2022 deaths
British rappers
British songwriters
British producers
Black British musicians
Musicians from London